Paul Adelman is a British historian who specialises in British political history of the nineteenth century and the first half of the twentieth century. Adelman has written four volumes in the popular Seminar Studies in History series, intended for undergraduate and younger study, and two in the Access to History series from Hodder intended for pre-university study. Adelman has also written for a number of journals, including History Today. He is a former school teacher and reader in history at Kingston University.

Selected publications
Gladstone, Disraeli and Later Victorian Politics. Longman, 1970. (Seminar Studies in History) (2nd edn 1983, 3rd 1997)
The Rise of the Labour Party 1880-1945. Longman, 1972. (Seminar Studies in History) 
The Decline of the Liberal Party, 1910-31. Longman, 1982. (Seminar Studies in History) 
Victorian radicalism: The middle-class experience 1830-1914. Longman, 1984. (Studies in Modern History) 
British Politics in the 1930s and 1940s. Cambridge University Press, 1987. (Cambridge Topics in History) 
Peel and the Conservative Party 1830-1850. Longman, 1989. (Seminar Studies In History)
Britain: Domestic Politics, 1939-64. Hodder Education, 1994. (Access to History) 
Great Britain and the Irish Question 1798-1921. Hodder Education, 2005. (With Robert Pearce) (Access to History)

References 

Living people
British historians
Year of birth missing (living people)
British schoolteachers
Academics of Kingston University